Bumpailog is a village in Bhutan. It is located on Wangdue-Trongsa Highway, overlooking Rukubji village. These two villages fall under one divided chiwog, a Bhutanese administrative division. Bumpailog is about 70 km from Wangdue, and 50 km from Trongsa. Residents make a living through agriculture and animal husbandry; vegetable farming and the products of domestic animals compose most of their income.

The Bumpailog Lhakhang is the public temple of the Bumpailog community.

Populated places in Bhutan